This is a list of contestants who have appeared on the television show Asia's Next Top Model. Thai model and current host Cindy Bishop (season 4–present), together with a panel of experts, judge a number of aspiring models competing to win a modeling contract, along with other prizes.

A total of six seasons have aired since the show first aired in November 25, 2012. A total of 86 contestants have been selected to compete in its six years running, with six models (Jessica Amornkuldilok, Sheena Liam, Ayu Gani, Tawan Kedkong, Maureen Wroblewitz, and Dana Slosar) having been crowned "Asia's Next Top Model".

Contestants from all over the world of Asian descent are allowed to apply to be on the show through video-auditioning, and then a few chosen are invited to attend casting calls in Singapore.

Contestants

Crossovers

 Thuy Trang Nguyen previously competed in the second season of Vietnam's Next Top Model, where she placed 4th.
 Mai Ngo previously competed in the fourth season of Vietnam's Next Top Model, where she placed 15th-18th.
 Adela-Mae Marshall previously competed in the second season of Philippines' Next Top Model, where she placed 2nd.
 Mia Sabathy previously competed in the seventh season of Austria's Next Top Model, where she placed 3rd.

Statistics
Quitters: 2 - Monica Benjaratjarunun (Cycle 1) and Alaiza Malinao (Cycle 4)
Disqualifications: 1 - Randhawa Nametha (Cycle 5)
Models eliminated outside of judging panel: 4 - Jessie Yang (Cycle 2), Maya Goldman (Cycle 4), Lena Saetiao ( Cycle 6) and Hody Yim (Cycle 6)
Most times in the bottom two: 5 times - Stephanie Retuya (Cycle 1)
Most times in the bottom two for a winner: 2 times - Tawan Kedkong (Cycle 4) and Maureen Wroblewitz (Cycle 5)
Most times in the bottom two for a runner-up: 5 times - Stephanie Retuya (Cycle 1)
Fewest times in the bottom two for a winner: 0 times - Jessica Amornkuldilok (Cycle 1)
Fewest times in the bottom two for a runner-up: 0 times - Patricia Gunawan (Cycle 4), Minh Tu Nguyen (Cycle 5) and Shikin Gomez (Cycle 5)
Most first call-outs for a winner: 4 times - Jessica Amornkuldilok (Cycle 1)
Most first call-outs for a runner-up: 4 times - Monika Sta. Maria (Cycle 3) and Sang In Kim (Cycle 4)

References

Asia's Next Top Model contestants
Asia's Next Top Model